The following is a timeline of the history of the city of Santiago, Santiago Province, Chile.

Prior to 19th century
 1541
 12 February: Santiago de Nueva Extremadura founded by Spaniard Pedro de Valdivia.
 11 September: Settlement sacked by forces of Michimalonco.
 1552 – Coat of arms granted.
 1553 – Franciscan convent founded.
 1595 – San Augustin church built.
 1609
 Flooding of Mapocho River.
 :es:Real Audiencia de Chile (Royal Appeals Court) reestablished in Santiago.
 1647 – 1647 Santiago earthquake.
 1747 – Universidad de San Felipe founded.
 1753 – Santiago Metropolitan Cathedral building began.
 1760 – Basilica de la Merced built.
 1769 – Casa Colorada built.
 1779 – :es:Puente de Cal y Canto (bridge) built over Mapocho River (official inauguration 1782). 
 1783 – Flooding of Mapocho River.
 1795 – Consulado (merchant guild) established.
 1799 – Santiago Metropolitan Cathedral rebuilding completed.

19th century
 1805 – La Moneda (mint) built.
 1808 – Palacio de la Real Audiencia de Santiago built.
 1813 – Biblioteca Nacional de Chile and Instituto Nacional (school) established.
 1817 – City occupied by forces of Jose de San Martin.
 1821 – Cementerio General de Santiago established in Recoleta.
 1830 – Chilean National Museum of Natural History founded.
 1841 – Quinta Normal Park founded.
 1842 – University of Santiago, Chile founded.
 1845 – Caupolican Artisans Society founded.
 1849 – Astronomical observatory built.
 1852 – Valparaiso-Santiago telegraph begins operating.
 1852 – Valdivia chapel built.
 1856 – August: Premiere of 's play .
 1857 – Municipal Theatre of Santiago inaugurated.
 1863 – 8 December: Church of the Company Fire.
 1865 – Aqueduct built.
 1868 – Jesuit church burns down.
 1870
 Club Hípico de Santiago opens.
 Cholera epidemic.
 1872 – Benjamín Vicuña Mackenna becomes mayor.
 1873 – Parque Cousiño inaugurated.
 1875
 International Exposition held.
 Population: 148,284.
 Plaza La Serena built (approximate date).
 1876 – National Congress Building inaugurated.
 1882 – Central Post Office Building (Santiago) constructed.
 1885
 Estación Central (railway station) opens.
 Deutsche Wissenschaftliche Verein zu Santiago founded.
 1888 – Pontifical Catholic University of Chile founded.
 1893 – Santiago Stock Exchange founded.
 1895 – Population: 256,413.
 1897 – Estación Central (railway station) rebuilt.
 1900
 El Mercurio newspaper begins publication.
 Population: 269,886.

20th century
 1902 - Population: 322,059. (estimated)
 1905 – Parque Forestal inaugurated.
 1908 – December: Pan-American Scientific Congress held.
 1911 – Chilean National History Museum founded.
 1925 – Chilean National Zoo opens.
 1926 – Teatro Carrera opens.
 1927 – Santiago Metropolitan Park laid out.
 1935
 Teatro Oriente (theatre) built.
 Plaza de la Constitución (Santiago de Chile) laid out (approximate date).
 1936 – Cine Metro (cinema) opens.
 1945 – Chilean National Ballet founded.
 1948 –  headquartered in Santiago.
 1950 – 3ra de la Hora newspaper begins publication.
 1952 – Population: 664,575 city; 1,348,283 urban agglomeration.
 1960 – Arboretum Frutillar founded.
 1962 – 1962 FIFA World Cup held; Battle of Santiago occurs.
 1967 – Pudahuel Airport commissioned.
 1972
 Centro Cultural Gabriela Mistral inaugurated.
 United Nations Conference on Trade and Development held.
 1973 – 11 September: Chilean coup d'état.
 1974 – Torre Entel built.
 1975
 Santiago Metro begins operating.
 Population: 3,186,000 city; 3,262,990 urban agglomeration.
 1978
 Santiago Metro Line 2 begins operating.
 Paseo Ahumada pedestrianized.
 1980 – Santiago Metropolitan Region established.
 1981 – Museo Chileno de Arte Precolombino established.
 1984 – La Cuarta newspaper begins publication.
 1985 – 3 March: Earthquake.
 1990
 Metrotrén begins operating (San Fernando-Santiago).
 Jaime Ravinet becomes mayor.
 National Congress of Chile relocated to Valparaíso from Santiago.
 1991 – July 21: 1991 Copa América final football tournament held.
 1995 – Population: 4,229,970 (estimate).
 1997 – Santiago Metro Line 5 begins operating.
 1998 – 2nd Summit of the Americas held.

21st century

 2002
 Jardín Botánico Chagual (garden) established.
 Population of Santiago (commune): 200,792; population of metro area: 5,428,590.
 2004 – Raúl Alcaíno Lihn becomes mayor.
 2005
 Santiago Metro Line 4 begins operating.
 Plaza de la Ciudadanía inaugurated (approximate date).
 2006
 Centro Cultural Palacio de La Moneda built.
 Gran Torre Santiago construction begins.
 2007 – March: Protests.
 2008
 Mall Plaza Alameda in business.
 Pablo Zalaquett Said becomes mayor.
 2010
 27 February: 2010 Chile earthquake.
 28 September: Time capsule buried in the Plaza de Armas.
 8 December: Fire in prison in San Miguel.
 Taller Bloc (art space) founded.
 2012 – Carolina Tohá becomes mayor.
 2014 – Homeless World Cup football contest held.
 2016 – Population: 5,561,252.
 2017
 July: Snowfall.
 Santiago Metro Line 6 begins operating.

See also
 Santiago history (article section)
 
 Political divisions of Santiago
 
 Timeline of Chilean history

References

This article incorporates information from the Spanish Wikipedia.

Bibliography

in English
Published in the 18th–19th centuries
 
 
 
 

Published in the 20th century
 
 
 
 
 
 
 
 
 
 
 

Published in the 21st century

in Spanish
 
  v.1, v.2

External links

 

santiago
 
Santiago
Years in Chile
Santiago Chile